Bogus is a 1996 American fantasy film directed by Norman Jewison from a screenplay written by Alvin Sargent, and starring Whoopi Goldberg, Gérard Depardieu, and Haley Joel Osment. It features magic tricks with magician Whit Haydn as consultant. 

Recently orphaned, a young boy is taken in by his adoptive aunt who is shocked to realize that she can see the boy's imaginary friend: a flamboyant, French magician named Bogus.

The film did poorly at the box office and Goldberg was nominated for a Razzie Award for her performance. It was filmed in Canada and New Jersey.

Plot

Albert Franklin lives with his mom Lorraine Franklin in Nevada and she is a showgirl. One evening, on her way home after work, she is killed in a car crash. 

Lorraine named her foster sister Harriet Franklin as Franklin's godmother. At first insisting she has zero instincts or interest in being responsible for a child, upon learning that without her he will end up in fostercare, she grudgingly accepts.

Albert unhappily leaves his Nevada home by plane to Newark, New Jersey. On the plane Bogus is 'born' from a sketch he drew on the journey. Harriet is late picking up Albert, and soon discovers that he has a friend noone else can see. 
 
The little boy resists all offers of help, repeating over and over to Bogus that he doesn't like it there. As he won't come down for dinner, she leaves a sandwich and milk in his room. He goes to school the next day and again she is late getting him. 

Albert wanders off with Bogus and they wind up in the park. Meanwhile, Harriet and school personell go looking for him, finding him as he's dueling with his invisible friend. On the way to her appointment with Bob, they discuss magic, he is a firm believer and she isn't at all. 

Hoping to expand her business, the meeting with Bob is to convince him and the bank to invest in her. He plays make-believe with Albert, then invites him to Doug's, his also young son's, birthday party. Later, at the party, Harriet is asked by a magician to participate in the show and she refuses vehemently.

That night, at home, Albert acknowledges that the party magician was terrible, then shows her a better trick. When he tries to show her another, she shoos him away, saying she's too busy and angering him. 

The next evening, Albert sneaks out while the babysitter is sleeping, as he sees magician Monsieur Antoine he knows from Vegas is playing that night in Atlantic City. He grabs a bus there. His magician friends have him sleep, and he dreams about his mom. 

In the meantime, Harriet sees the ad for the magician in Atlantic City and collects him in her car. She puts him to bed and finally, in the kitchen, she is able to see Bogus as she opens her mind. They dance together and then she comes back into reality in the living room.

Going into Albert's room to tell him she sees Bogus, Harriet discovers he's climbing the fire escape to the roof. In his mind, he's following his mother to heaven. Harriet calls him from the roof, encouraging to make the last few steps. The fantasy vanishes for him, and he makes it up and into her arms. They promise to try to be a family for each other. 

Flying to Nevada, Albert and Harriet visit Lorraine's grave. Later, they goof around, play acting. Bogus says goodbye and they don't notice.

Cast
 Whoopi Goldberg as Harriet Franklin
 Gérard Depardieu as Bogus
 Haley Joel Osment as Albert Franklin
 Nancy Travis as Lorraine Franklin
 Andrea Martin as Penny
 Denis Mercier as Monsieur Antoine
 Ute Lemper as Babette
 Sheryl Lee Ralph as Ruth Clark
 Al Waxman as School Principal
 Fiona Reid as School Teacher
 Kevin Jackson as Bob Morrison
 Richard Portnow as M. Clay Thrasher
 Stefan Batory as M. Clay Fisher
 Barbara Hamilton as Mrs. Partridge

Filming location
Although portrayed as Newark, NJ, part of the film was filmed in the Van Vorst Park neighborhood of Downtown Jersey City. The apartment building that the character, Harriet, lives in at the corner of York Street and Barrow Street is called Madison on the Van Vorst Park.

Release
Bogus opened at #11 in its opening weekend with $1,895,593 and grossed $4,357,406 in the US.

Reception
Rotten Tomatoes reports that 41% of 17 surveyed critics gave the film a positive review; the average rating is 5/10.  Leonard Klady of Variety wrote, "Sweetly sentimental and anachronistically whimsical, Bogus is a modern metaphor oddly out of step with contemporary taste." Janet Maslin of The New York Times wrote, "Jewison lays on the dry ice and special effects without adding emotion to a slow, hackneyed story." Roger Ebert of the Chicago Sun-Times rated it 3/4 stars and called it "a charming, inconsequential fantasy" that wisely avoids realism. Audiences surveyed by CinemaScore gave the film a grade of "B+" on a scale of A+ to F.

References

External links
 
 
 
 

1996 films
1990s children's comedy films
1990s fantasy comedy films
American children's comedy films
American children's fantasy films
American fantasy comedy films
Films about orphans
Films directed by Norman Jewison
Films scored by Marc Shaiman
Films set in the Las Vegas Valley
Films set in New Jersey
Films shot in Atlantic City, New Jersey
Films shot in the Las Vegas Valley
Films shot in Toronto
Regency Enterprises films
Warner Bros. films
1996 comedy films
Films produced by Arnon Milchan
1990s English-language films
1990s American films